The House of Norodom (UNGEGN: ,) is the ruling royal house of Cambodia. Its members are direct descendants of King Norodom (1860–1904), a son of the "Great-King", Ang Duong. The current head of the House of Norodom is the current king of Cambodia, Norodom Sihamoni. Norodom is one of only two royal houses of Cambodia. Its counterpart, the House of Sisowath, is named after another son of Ang Duong, Sisowath. Four members have served as Kings of Cambodia, and three as Prime Ministers.

Members

 Norodom (1834–1904) 
 Norodom Sutharot (1872–1945)
 Norodom Phangangam (1874–1944)
 Norodom Kanviman Norleak Tevi (1876–1912) 
 Norodom Suramarit (1896–1960)
 Sisowath Kossamak (by marriage; 1904–1975)
 Norodom Kantol (1920–1976) 
 Norodom Sihanouk (1922–2012)
 Norodom Monineath (by marriage; born 1936)
 Norodom Yuvaneath (1943–2021) 
 Norodom Buppha Devi (1943–2019)
 Norodom Ranariddh (1944–2021)
 Norodom Chakrapong (born 1945) 
 Norodom Vichara (1946–2013) 
 Norodom Marie Ranariddh (by marriage; born 1948) 
 Norodom Kuntha Bopha (1948–1952)
 Norodom Sirivudh (born 1951)
 Norodom Sihamoni (born 1953)
 Norodom Narindrapong (1954–2003)
 Norodom Arunrasmy (born 1955)
 Norodom Soma (born 1969)
 Norodom Rattana Devi (born 1974) 
Norodom Jenna (born 2012)

List of Norodom monarchs

List of Norodom consorts

List of Norodom Prime Ministers

References

 
Asian royal families
Cambodian monarchy